Champion Without a Crown (Spanish: Campeón sin corona) is a 1946 Mexican sports film directed by Alejandro Galindo and starring David Silva, Amanda del Llano and Carlos López Moctezuma. It is set in the world of boxing.

Cast
 David Silva as Roberto 'Kid' Terranova 
 Amanda del Llano as Lupita  
 Carlos López Moctezuma as Sr. Rosas 
 Fernando Soto as El chupa  
 Nelly Montiel as Susana  
 Víctor Parra a sJoe Ronda  
 María Gentil Arcos as Doña Gracia, Madre de Roberto 
 Pepe del Río as Juan Zubieta  
 Félix Medel as Don Roque  
 Aurora Cortés as Anastacia  
 José Pardavé as Amigo de Roberto  
 Salvador Quiroz as Presidente de la comisión de boxeo  
 Alberto Catalá as Second 
 Bucky Gutierrez as Pilar, sirvienta  
 Roberto Cañedo as Ordoñez  
 Antonio Padilla 'Pícoro' as Presentador de peleas 
 Carlos Aguirre as Amigo de Susana  
 Stephen Berne as Hombre calvo entrenando gimnasio  
 Clifford Carr as Mr. Carr, representante de Ronda 
 Fernando Curiel as Jorge  
 Ramiro Gamboa as Locutor  
 Leonor Gómez as Cocinera  
 Alfonso Jiménez as Policía  
 Ramón G. Larrea as Amigo de Susana  
 Pedro Mago Septien as Locutor  
 Héctor Mateos as Vendedor
 Ignacio Peón as Mesonero  
 Estanislao Schillinsky as Mora 
 Hernán Vera as Cantinero

References

Bibliography 
 Segre, Erica. Intersected Identities: Strategies of Visualisation in Nineteenth- and Twentieth-century Mexican Culture. Berghahn Books, 2007.

External links 
 

1946 films
1940s sports films
Mexican boxing films
1940s Spanish-language films
Films directed by Alejandro Galindo
Mexican black-and-white films
1940s Mexican films